Ladies of London is an American reality television series that premiered on June 2, 2014, and aired on Bravo. The series chronicled the lives of six women who reside in London, United Kingdom, as they balance their social lives, businesses, and families.

The series originally focused on Juliet Angus, Caprice Bourret, Marissa Hermer, Annabelle Neilson, Noelle Reno and Caroline Stanbury. The final cast consisted of Angus, Hermer, Caroline Stanbury, Julie Montagu, Caroline Fleming and Sophie Stanbury. Of the original cast members, Bourret and Reno departed after the first season, and Neilson left at the conclusion of the second. Montagu and Fleming joined the cast in the second season, and Sophie Stanbury in the third.

In March 2015, Bravo renewed Ladies of London for a second season, which premiered on September 7, 2015. In April 2016, the show was renewed for a third season.

On July 12th, 2018, Neilson, who was a muse for the late fashion designer Alexander McQueen, died at her Chelsea home in London.

Cast

Timeline

Episodes

Series overview

Season 1 (2014)

Season 2 (2015)

Season 3 (2016–2017)

References

External links

 
 
 

2010s American reality television series
2014 American television series debuts
2017 American television series endings
Bravo (American TV network) original programming
English-language television shows
Television shows set in London
Women in London